is a passenger railway station located in the city of Aki, Kōchi Prefecture, Japan. It is operated by the third-sector Tosa Kuroshio Railway with the station number "GN27".

Lines
It is the main station and depot for the Asa Line and all trains, both rapid and local, stop at the station.

Layout
The station consists of an island platform serving two tracks on an embankment. Numerous sidings which form the Asa Line depot are located north of the main tracks. The station building is located at the base of the embankment and houses a waiting area, a local produce market and a staffed ticket window. Besides tickets for the line, the ticket window is also equipped with a JR Shikoku (Midori no Madoguchi) facility and can accept reservations and sell tickets for JR trains. Access to the island platform is by means of an underpass leading to a flight of steps and an elevator. A bike shed and bike rentals are available.

Adjacent stations

Station mascot
Each station on the Asa Line features a cartoon mascot character designed by Takashi Yanase, a local cartoonist from Kōchi Prefecture. The mascot for Aki Station is a figure of a singer with music note motifs on her costume named . The music theme relates to Ryūtarō Hirota, a Japanese composer who was born in Aki.

History

Passenger statistics
In fiscal 2011, the station was used by an average of 1,053 passengers daily.

Surrounding area
Aki Station Jibasan Market - a produce market housed within the station building selling local foodstuffs and souvenirs.
Aki City Hall

See also 
List of railway stations in Japan

References

External links

Aki Station (Tosa Kuroshio Railway) 

Railway stations in Kōchi Prefecture
Railway stations in Japan opened in 2002
Aki, Kōchi